Jan Chipchase is the founder of Studio D Radiodurans, a research, design and strategy consultancy that specializes in understanding consumer behavior in emerging markets. He was previously Executive Creative Director of Global Insights at Frog Design, where he led  the firm’s global research practice in both mainstream and emerging markets. Before joining Frog Design in 2010, Chipchase was Principal Scientist at Nokia,  where he researched how technology works and is adopted in different cultures, with a focus on understanding technology 3 to 15 years out.

He has lived in London, Berlin, San Francisco, Shanghai, Los Angeles, and almost a decade in Tokyo. To date, he holds 25 patents granted and pending.

Early life and education
Chipchase was born in London to a German mother and British father. He was raised in London, Brighton, and Berlin.

Chipchase received a BA in Economics and a MSc in User Interface Design from London Guildhall University. He has described himself as a "failed economist" and a "failed academic".

Publications
In 2010, Chipchase published "Mobile Money Afghanistan," a report on the nascent use of money through mobile phones.

In 2011, Chipchase published the results of a 6-month experiment "Red Mat" to explore the dynamics of crowd-sourcing in China. The experiment engaged hundreds of people in the act of making a giant Chinese flag out of pieces sourced from across China, without revealing what they were making to  the participants. The experiment explores the question of whether it’s possible to engage hundreds of people in an act of subversion without any of the people knowing what they are subverting against, until that moment when the subversive act becomes clear. The experiment explores notions of nationalism, the state, morality, corporate ethics and behavior.

Chipchase has written for numerous international publications including Die Zeit, The Atlantic, Fast Company, National Geographic and a monthly column for China's Economic Observer, with his field-photography also appearing in GEO magazine.   His first book entitled Hidden in Plain Sight was published by Harper Business and released in April 2013. Other books of his include Today's Office, and The Field Study Handbook, releasing for retail print in July 2017.

Appearances and advisory roles

Chipchase has presented his work at the TED Conference, the World Bank, Pop! Tech, International CES, and The Economist’s Human Potential Conference.

His research has been featured in the New York Times Magazine, Businessweek, and The Economist, among others.
In 2010, Fortune Magazine featured Chipchase as a prominent designer in "The Smartest People in Tech".

He sits on advisory boards for several organizations, including:
 The Broadcasting Board of Governor's Commission on Innovation 
Frontline SMS 
Pecha Kucha Foundation
 Makeshift Magazine 
 The Institute for Money, Technology, and Financial Inclusion

References

External links
 Talk at Lift Asia conference on "Nine trends shaping the future of social interactions"
 
 
 New York Times Magazine article about Jan Chipchase
 Future Perfect his personal blog
 The smartest people in tech in Fortune Magazine
 Die Zeit- "Keine Fremde Mehr"
 Economic Observer - 去首尔看屏幕文化的未来

Usability
Human–computer interaction researchers
Living people
Year of birth missing (living people)